Cyril Saugrain (born 22 June 1973 in Livry-Gargan, Seine-Saint-Denis) is a French former professional road bicycle racer, who won the 4th stage of the 1996 Tour de France.
He is a consultant cyclist at the RTBF.

Major results

1995
1st Stage 4 Tour du Vaucluse
1st Stage 1 Quatre Jours de l'Aisne
1st Stage 1 Tour de l'Ain
1st Aubervilliers
3rd La Côte Picarde
1996
1st Stage 4 Tour de France
1st Stage 4 Tour du Vaucluse
1st Châteauroux Classic
1997
2nd Route Adélie de Vitré
5th Trophée des Grimpeurs
1998
2nd Grand Prix de Plumelec-Morbihan
1999
1st Grand Prix de Villers-Cotterêts
2002
4th Paris–Bourges

External links 

Official Tour de France results for Cyril Saugrain

1973 births
Living people
People from Livry-Gargan
French male cyclists
French Tour de France stage winners
Sportspeople from Seine-Saint-Denis
Cyclists from Île-de-France